Okapi is an Asheville, North Carolina-based experimental musical duo composed of Scott Mitchell Gorski (upright bass) and Lindsey Miller (cello).

History 
The two met and began performing in Chicago in 2012, but have called Appalachia home since moving there in 2017.

Sound 
Okapi's music draws from classical, jazz, Middle Eastern and psychedelia phrasings, and through his lyrics, Gorski tries giving artistic voice to a doctrine and philosophy written like a mission statement on the Okapi website.

Big Ears Festival 
Okapi was selected to perform at the 2022 Big Ears experimental festival alongside illustrious performers such as John Zorn, Patti Smith and Animal Collective.

Collaborations 
In October, 2019 Okapi collaborated with Luke H. Walker on his play The Wake of Dick Johnson, composing the score for the third run of the play at Performance Space 122 in New York City. A review of the play by Broadwayworld.com lauded their "chilling" performance, citing the band's unmistakable talent and eerie sounds. Broadwayworld wrote, "Throughout the play, the two perform with both a creepy rawness changing the tempo as quick as Dick's moods."

References 

American experimental musical groups
American musical duos
2012 establishments in Illinois
Musical groups from Asheville, North Carolina